Pierre-Claude Fontenai (16 July 1683, in Paris – 13 October 1742, in La Flèche), was an 18th-century French Jesuit priest and historian.

He was rector of the college of Orléans when he was instructed to continue the Histoire de l'Église gallicane begun by Jacques Longueval. Taking residence in the maison professe de Paris, he published volumes IX and X and prepared volume XI.

He led the observation of the solar eclipse on 12 July 1684 at the collège Louis-le-Grand.

Texts 
 Histoire de l'Église gallicane, vol 9 et 10, París, 1739 and 1744.

Sources 
 H. Beylard: Article Fontenai, Pierre-Claude dans Diccionario historico de la Compañia de Jesús, vol.II, Roma, IHSI, 2001, (p. 1483).

References 

Clergy from Paris
1663 births
1742 deaths
18th-century French Jesuits
18th-century French historians
Historians of the Catholic Church